Josef Duchač (born February 19, 1938) is a German politician (CDU).

The studied chemical engineer became a member of the East German Christian Democratic Union in 1957. After the party merged with the West German CDU following the German reunification, he was elected Thuringia's first post-reunification minister-president on October 14, 1990.

On January 23, 1992, he announced his resignation because of alleged Stasi contacts and was succeeded by Bernhard Vogel on February 5, 1992.

References

1938 births
Living people
Members of the Landtag of Thuringia
Ministers-President of Thuringia
Christian Democratic Union (East Germany) politicians
Christian Democratic Union of Germany politicians